Liolaemus nazca is a species of lizard in the family Iguanidae.  It is found in Peru.

References

nazca
Lizards of South America
Reptiles of Peru
Endemic fauna of Peru
Reptiles described in 2019
Taxa named by Jack W. Sites Jr.